Events in the year 2021 in Argentina.

Incumbents 
President: Alberto Fernández
Vice President: Cristina Fernández de Kirchner

Governors 
Governor of Buenos Aires Province: Axel Kicillof
Governor of Catamarca Province: Raúl Jalil
Governor of Chaco Province: Jorge Capitanich
Governor of Chubut Province: Mariano Arcioni
Governor of Córdoba: Juan Schiaretti
Governor of Corrientes Province: Gustavo Valdés
Governor of Entre Ríos Province: Gustavo Bordet
Governor of Formosa Province: Gildo Insfrán
Governor of Jujuy Province: Gerardo Morales
Governor of La Pampa Province: Sergio Ziliotto
Governor of La Rioja Province: Ricardo Quintela
Governor of Mendoza Province: Rodolfo Suárez
Governor of Misiones Province: Oscar Herrera Ahuad
Governor of Neuquén Province: Omar Gutiérrez
Governor of Río Negro Province: Arabela Carreras
Governor of Salta Province: Gustavo Sáenz
Governor of San Juan Province: Sergio Uñac
Governor of San Luis Province: Alberto Rodríguez Saá
Governor of Santa Cruz Province: Alicia Kirchner
Governor of Santa Fe Province: Omar Perotti
Governor of Santiago del Estero: Gerardo Zamora
Governor of Tierra del Fuego: Gustavo Melella
Governor of Tucumán: Juan Luis Manzur

Vice Governors 
Vice Governor of Buenos Aires Province: Verónica Magario
Vice Governor of Catamarca Province: Rubén Dusso
Vice Governor of Chaco Province: Analía Rach Quiroga
Vice Governor of Corrientes Province: Gustavo Canteros
Vice Governor of Entre Rios Province: María Laura Stratta
Vice Governor of Formosa Province: Eber Wilson Solís
Vice Governor of Jujuy Province: Carlos Haquim
Vice Governor of La Pampa Province: Mariano Fernández
Vice Governor of La Rioja Province: Florencia López
 Vice Governor of Mendoza Province: Mario Abed
Vice Governor of Misiones Province: Carlos Omar Arce
Vice Governor of Neuquén Province: Marcos Koopmann
Vice Governor of Rio Negro Province: Alejandro Palmieri
Vice Governor of Salta Province: Antonio Marocco
Vice Governor of San Juan Province: Roberto Gattoni
Vice Governor of San Luis Province: Eduardo Mones Ruiz
Vice Governor of Santa Cruz: Eugenio Quiroga
Vice Governor of Santa Fe Province: Alejandra Rodenas
Vice Governor of Santiago del Estero: Carlos Silva Neder
Vice Governor of Tierra del Fuego: Mónica Urquiza

Ongoing events 
COVID-19 pandemic in Argentina

Events 
22 January – Germany rejects a claim that a request by Lufthansa Airlines to fly over Argentina en route to the Malvinas implies a recognition of them as Argentine territory. Lufthansa needs a new route to support a polar research expedition because the normal route has been suspended due to the COVID-19 pandemic in South Africa.
10 February – Argentina passes 2,000,000 confirmed cases and nearly 50,000 deaths related to COVID-19.
18 February – Thousands demonstrate against gender violence following the murder of Ursula Bahillo, 18.
19 February
A federal court sentences eight sailors and police officers and a civilian in the trial of crimes against humanity perpetrated during the military dictatorship of 1976–1983 at the Navy Petty-Officers School (Esma). Among those convicted are former Navy officer Carlos Castellvi, police officer Raúl Cabral, and civilian Miguel Conde.
Ginés González García resigns as Health Minister after it is revealed he provided preferential treatment for COVID-19 vaccines to journalist Horacio Verbitsky. Argentina has received only 1.5 million doses of vaccine for its population of 45 million. Two million have been infected and 50,000 people have died.
24 March – Argentina leaves the Lima Group, criticizing the participation of Juan Guaido.
April 1 – COVID-19 pandemic: The National Institute of Statistics reports a steep increase in the poverty rates in 31 large cities, affecting 12 million people.
April 3 – President Alberto Fernandez, 62, tests positive for COVID-19 despite having received the Sputnik V COVID-19 vaccine in January.
June 9 – President Alberto Fernandez sets off a Twitter storm after saying, "The Mexicans came from the Indians, the Brazilians came from the jungle, but we Argentines came from the ships." He later apologizes.
June 11 – A study by the Cámara Argentina de Internet (Cabase) reveals that 32% of homes do not have fixed access to Internet. The figure falls to 50% in some provinces.
July 10 – The Argentinia national football team wins the Copa América at the mythical Maracanã Stadium against Brazil. It was their first one since 1993.
November 22 – Buenos Aires – A group of 9 hooded individuals hurled several bombs at the headquarters of Clarín Argentine newspaper on Monday night. The attack was filmed by surveillance cameras, which captured the moment when the group arrived on foot, at 11:05 PM, and hurled at least 7 Molotov cocktails – a type of homemade bomb in which a flammable liquid is placed inside a glass bottle – against the building of one of the country's main media outlets. The bombs damaged the building's façade and started a fire in the entrance, but no one was injured.

Deaths

January 
 
 
 

1 January – Carlos Escudé, political scientist and author (b. 1938).
3 January – Raúl Baglini, politician, MP (b. 1949).
4 January – Guillermo Rodríguez Melgarejo, Roman Catholic prelate, Bishop of San Martín (b 1943).
10 January – , 83, race car driver.
15 January – Vicente Cantatore, 85, football player (San Lorenzo, Tigre) and manager (Real Valladolid).
16 January – Juan Carlos Copes, Argentine tango dancer, choreographer, and performer (b. 1931).
21 January – José Pampuro, 71, politician, Minister of Defense (2003–2005), General Secretary of the Presidency (2002–2003) and Provisional President of the Senate (2006–2011).
23 January – , 45, bassist (Catupecu Machu).
28 January – César Isella, 82, singer-songwriter (Los Fronterizos).
30 January – Alberto Neuman, 87, classical pianist.

February 
 
 
 

 2 February – Julio Argentino Fernández, 75, agriculture production executive; heart disease.
5 February – Ángela Sureda, 99, lawyer, academic and politician, Deputy (1989–1993).
6 February – Osvaldo Mercuri, 76, politician, president of the Buenos Aires Province Chamber of Deputies (1989–1997, 2001–2005); COVID-19.
7 February – Adrián Di Blasi, 54, journalist and sports writer; COVID-19.
8 February – José Francisco Suárez, 80, referee, entrepreneur and gastronomic chef.
9 February – Ivan Izquierdo, 83, Argentine-born Brazilian neurobiologist; COVID-19.
10 February – Jorge Morel, 89, classical guitarist and composer.
12 February – Jorge Ricci, 74, actor and playwright.
14 February – Carlos Menem, 90, politician (Justicialist Party), President of Argentina (1989–1999), national senator (2005–2021).
15 February
Alberto Canapino, 57, racing car engineer; COVID-19.
Leopoldo Luque, 71, footballer (River Plate, Unión, national team), world champion (1978); COVID-19.
17 February – Omar Moreno Palacios, 82, folk singer-songwriter, guitarist and gaucho; encephalitis.
22 February – Élida Rasino, 65, politician; COVID-19.
26 February
José Guccione, 69, politician and physician, deputy (2011–2015); COVID-19.
Horacio Moráles, 77, Olympic footballer (1964).
27 February – Gipsy Bonafina, 63, actress (Amapola) and singer.

March to June 
2 March – Carlos Sánchez, 68, humorist; cancer
9 March – Agustín Balbuena, 75, footballer (Colón de Santa Fe, Independiente).
12 March – Maximiliano Djerfy, 46, guitarist (Callejeros); cardiac arrest.
26 March – , 93, astrologist.
29 March – Carlos Busqued, 50, writer, radio producer, and engineer.
23 April – Mario Meoni, 56, politician, minister of transport (since 2019), mayor of Junín Partido (2003–2015) and Buenos Aires provincial deputy (1999–2003), traffic collision.

References 

2021 in Argentina
2020s in Argentina
Years of the 21st century in Argentina
Argentina
Argentina